Khlong Chorakhe Sam Phan, also called Maenam Chorakhe Sam Phan or Lam Chorakhe Sam Phan,  is a watercourse in the provinces of Kanchanaburi and Suphan Buri, Thailand. It is a tributary of the Tha Chin River.

Its name translates roughly as "three thousand crocodiles" presumably it is because in the past the abundance of crocodiles [or may mean three species of crocodiles] . This river is considered to be of historical and archaeological importance. Because in the watershed area at U Thong District, Suphan Buri used to be an ancient community before. There is an excavation to discover an antique carved jade that has a crocodile [or makara]-like shape.   Moreover, U Thong in the past, was called Chorakhe Sam Phan.

Khlong Chorakhe Sam Phan separates itself from the Thuan River in Kanchanaburi, then flows from Phanom Thuan District through U Thong District converge with Tha Wa River at Ban Phai Ngoi. After that, flows through Bang Li Market at Song Phi Nong District, Suphanburi to mouth of Khlong Song Phi Nong and finally converge with the Tha Chin River.

References

Chorakhe Sam Phan